Law of the Plains is a 1938 American Western film directed by Sam Nelson, starring Charles Starrett, and Iris Meredith.

Cast
 Charles Starrett as Chuck Saunders
 Iris Meredith as Marion
 Bob Nolan as Bob
 Robert Warwick as Willard McGowan
 Dick Curtis as Jim Fletcher
 Edward LeSaint as William Norton
 Edmund Cobb as Slagle
 Art Mix as Grant
 Jack Rockwell as Marshal
 George Chesebro as Bartender
 Sons of the Pioneers

References

1938 films
1938 Western (genre) films
Columbia Pictures films
Films directed by Sam Nelson
American black-and-white films
American Western (genre) films
1930s English-language films
1930s American films